Sarah Aristidou, or Sarah Mzali-Aristidou (born 1991) is a French-Cypriot operatic soprano who has performed internationally. She is interested in contemporary music and has appeared in world premieres. Composers such as Aribert Reimann and Jörg Widmann have written music for her.

Life and career 
Born in Paris, Aristidou began her musical training as a member of the Maîtrise de Radio France. Beginning in 2010, she studied singing at the Universität der Künste Berlin, and from 2014 at the University of Music and Performing Arts Munich. She received her master's degree at the Bayerische Theaterakademie August Everding.

Aristidou appeared in world premieres of contemporary music by composers such as Wolfgang Rihm and Manfred Trojahn. Aribert Reimann composed Cinq Fragments français de Rainer Maria Rilke especially for her voice, and she premiered it in 2015 at the Liederwerkstatt of the Kissinger Sommer festival.

She has worked with conductors such as Daniel Barenboim, Trevor Pinnock and Simon Rattle, and with orchestras including the Berliner Philharmoniker, Deutsches Symphonie-Orchester Berlin and the Gürzenich Orchestra. She was a member of the international opera studio of the Berlin State Opera from 2017 to 2019. In the 2020/21 season, she appeared at the State Opera as Zerbinetta in Ariadne auf Naxos, and performed at the Heidelberger Frühling and the Salzburg Festival.

Recording 
Aristidou's first CD appeared in 2021, titled Æther, with works by Edgar Varèse, Francis Poulenc, Leo Delibes, Ambroise Thomas, Jörg Widmann, Claude Debussy, Igor Strawinsky, Thomas Adès, George Frideric Handel and Udo Zimmermann, with pianist Daniel Barenboim, flutist Emmanuel Pahud, guitarist Christian Rivet, the Chor der Klangverwaltung and Orchester des Wandels conducted by Thomas Guggeis. Widmann's Labyrinth V was written for the singer, and the wordless piece contains "ululations, sobs, jazz inflections and wild laughter", according to a reviewer from Gramophone.

Awards 
 2021 Luitpold Prize
 2022 Belmont Prize

References

Further reading

External links
 

1991 births
Living people
French operatic sopranos
French people of Cypriot descent
Singers from Paris
Berlin University of the Arts alumni
University of Music and Performing Arts Munich alumni